The 2017–18 season was Crystal Palace's fifth consecutive season in the Premier League (which at that point had become their longest spell in the top division of English football) and the 112th year in their history. That season, Crystal Palace participated in the Premier League, FA Cup and EFL Cup. Frank de Boer was appointed as manager of Palace before the season began, only to be sacked on 11 September 2017 after losing his first four Premier League games without scoring. Former England national team manager Roy Hodgson was confirmed as his replacement the next day. Palace finished in 11th place in the Premier League, and were knocked out of the FA Cup and Carabao Cup in the third and fourth rounds, respectively.

The season covered the period from 1 July 2017 to 30 June 2018.

Review

Pre-season
Crystal Palace started the season with the newly appointed Frank de Boer as manager, following the close season resignation of Sam Allardyce. A number of players were released at the end of their contracts, including first-team players Fraizer Campbell, Mathieu Flamini and Joe Ledley. Steve Mandanda was sold back to Marseille after a single season with the club. Early July saw the arrival of Jaïro Riedewald on a permanent transfer from Ajax and Ruben Loftus-Cheek on loan from Chelsea. As a warm-up to the season, the team took part in the Asia Trophy in Hong Kong (where they won one game and lost one), and had friendlies against Metz and Schalke 04, both of which were drawn. A week before the season started, Timothy Fosu-Mensah was loaned in from Manchester United.

August
Crystal Palace opened the Premier League season at home to newly promoted Huddersfield Town, a game they lost 0–3. An away defeat to Liverpool and another home defeat, to Swansea City, saw pressure grow on Frank de Boer. The first win of the season came against Ipswich Town in the Carabao Cup. Transfer deadline-day saw the arrival of Mamadou Sakho from Liverpool, following a successful spell on loan at the end of the previous season.

September
Following a fourth consecutive league defeat to Burnley, and with the team still goalless in the competition, Palace sacked De Boer on 11 September, replacing him the next day with former England manager Roy Hodgson. The poor run of league form continued with another three defeats, to Southampton, Manchester City and Manchester United. The second round of the Carabao Cup saw the team exact revenge for their opening day defeat by beating Huddersfield Town. By the end of the month, Crystal Palace were four points adrift at the bottom of the Premier League table, with seven defeats and no goals scored.

October
After an international break at the start of the month, Crystal Palace finally won a game: defeating the reigning Premier League champions, Chelsea, at home by a score of 2–1. Palace took an early lead through an own-goal with Chelsea equalising soon after. Wilfried Zaha scored the winning goal on the stroke of half-time. The third round of the Carabao Cup saw Palace travel to play Championship team Bristol City. Despite opening the scoring, they ended up on the wrong end of a 4–1 defeat. The month finished with another away defeat, this time to Newcastle, and a 2–2 home draw with West Ham, with Zaha scoring an equaliser seven minutes into injury time at the end of the game.

November
An away defeat to Spurs started the month, but the turnaround in home form continued with a 2–2 draw with Everton and a 2–1 victory over Stoke. On 28 November, Crystal Palace travelled away to play rivals Brighton & Hove Albion, returning with their first away point of the season after a 0–0 draw. The match saw a significant number of Palace fans locked-out following allegations of crowd disturbances. The local police reported a number of weapons were recovered at the match, a claim they later admitted was false.

December
A second successive goalless away draw against West Bromwich Albion saw Crystal Palace move off the foot of the table for the first time in 11 games, though they returned there after another 2–2 home draw with AFC Bournemouth. During injury time at the end of this match, Palace were awarded a penalty. Despite Luka Milivojević scoring a penalty earlier in the match, striker Christian Benteke insisted on taking it and his weak effort was saved, leading to criticism from his manager and the press. A home match with Watford saw Palace's habit of scoring late goals continue, with Bakary Sako and James McArthur scoring goals in the 89th and 91st minutes respectively to overcome a third-minute goal by their opponents. The next match was far less stressful: Palace were comfortable 3–0 winners over Leicester City, the match marking both the first away goals and the first away win of the league campaign, and moved the team up to 14th in the table. A further away point was gained with a draw at Swansea, which extended an unbeaten streak to eight matches, Palace's best ever in the Premier League. This run came to an end with a 2–3 home defeat to Arsenal before the year finished with a hard-fought scoreless draw with Manchester City. This match marked the end of City's 18-match winning streak in the Premier League, but saw season-ending injuries to both Scott Dann and Jason Puncheon and a late penalty miss by Luka Milivojević.

January
The first game of the New Year saw Crystal Palace chalk-up their second away win of the season, against Southampton, with goals from James McArthur and Luka Milivojević overcoming an early goal from Shane Long for the hosts. In the third round of the FA Cup, Palace lost 2–1 to rivals Brighton, with former Eagle Glenn Murray scoring a late winner. Back in the league, the good run continued, with Bakary Sako scoring the only goal in the first half of the home game against Burnley. The next game saw an awful start by Palace, finding themselves four goals down within the first quarter of the away match against Arsenal. They staged a minor recovery, scoring the only goal in the second half to lose 4–1. Another local away match, this time against West Ham, ended in a 1–1 draw, with Christian Benteke scoring his second goal of the season to open the scoring before a penalty from Mark Noble evened the score just before half-time. During the transfer window, Crystal Palace bolstered their ranks with Polish defender Jarosław Jach and Norwegian striker Alexander Sørloth as permanent transfers and Swedish midfielder Erdal Rakip a loan-signing from Benfica. Squad-members Keshi Anderson and Freddie Ladapo left the club with Andre Coker and Sullay Kaikai loaned out.

Competitions

Premier League

League table

Results summary

Results by matchday

Matches

FA Cup
In the FA Cup, Crystal Palace entered the competition in the third round and were drawn away to Brighton & Hove Albion.

EFL Cup
Crystal Palace entered the competition in the second round where they were drawn against Ipswich Town. Another home tie was confirmed for the third round, against Huddersfield Town, but in the fourth round Palace were drawn away against Bristol City.

Pre-season
Crystal Palace had five pre-season friendlies against Maidstone United, Liverpool and West Bromwich Albion (2017 Premier League Asia Trophy), Metz and Schalke 04.

Players

First-team squad

Player statistics

Appearances and goals

|-
! colspan=14 style=background:#DCDCDC; text-align:center| Goalkeepers

|-
! colspan=14 style=background:#DCDCDC; text-align:center| Defenders

|-
! colspan=14 style=background:#DCDCDC; text-align:center| Midfielders

|-
! colspan=14 style=background:#DCDCDC; text-align:center| Forwards

|-
! colspan=14 style=background:#DCDCDC; text-align:center| Players out on loan

|-
!colspan=14 style=background:#DCDCDC; text-align:center| Players transferred out during the season

|}

Goalscorers

Disciplinary record

Transfers

Transfers in

Transfers out

Loans in

Loans out

References

Crystal Palace F.C. seasons
Crystal Palace
Crystal Palace
Crystal Palace